The 2011 BH Telecom Indoors was a professional tennis tournament played on hard courts. It was the ninth edition of the tournament which was part of the 2011 ATP Challenger Tour. It took place in Sarajevo, Bosnia and Herzegovina between 7 and 13 March 2011.

ATP entrants

Seeds

 Rankings are as of February 28, 2011.

Other entrants
The following players received wildcards into the singles main draw:
  Mirza Bašić
  Tomislav Brkić
  Amer Delić
  Franjo Raspudić

The following players received entry from the qualifying draw:
  Roko Karanušić
  Matwé Middelkoop
  Ante Pavić
  Alexander Sadecky

The following players received entry as a lucky loser into the singles main draw:
  Mislav Hižak
  Dino Marcan

Champions

Singles

 Amer Delić def.  Karol Beck, walkover

Doubles

 Jamie Delgado /  Jonathan Marray def.  Yves Allegro /  Andreas Beck, 7–6(4), 6–2

External links
Official Site
ITF Search
ATP official site

BH Telecom Indoors
BH Telecom Indoors
2011 in Bosnia and Herzegovina sport